George E. Cornelius is a former Secretary of the Pennsylvania Department of Community and Economic Development.

References

Living people
State cabinet secretaries of Pennsylvania
Year of birth missing (living people)